Deokgye Station is a train station on Line 1 of the Seoul Subway. It opened in December 2007.

Platforms
 Platform 1: to Ganeung / Seoul Station / Incheon
 Platform 2: to Soyosan / Dongducheon

Exits
 Exit 1: Deokgye Middle School, Toksan Elementary School, Tokkye Elementary School, Deokgye High School, Deokgye Protection Center
 Exit 2: Dodoon Elementary School

References 

Seoul Metropolitan Subway stations
Railway stations opened in 2007
Metro stations in Yangju